Birgit Honé (born 8 November 1960) is a German politician of the Social Democratic Party (SPD) who is serving as Minister of Federal and European Affairs and Regional Development in the state government of Minister-President Stephan Weil of Lower Saxony. Since 2017 she has been a member of the German Bundesrat.

Career in the public sector
From 1999 to 2002, Honé worked at the State Chancellery. Appointed by Minister-President Sigmar Gabriel, she later served as district president of Lüneburg from 2002 until 2004.

From 2004 to 2013, Honé served as a member of the Senate of the Lower Saxony State Audit Office. In this capacity, she was responsible for auditing the annual budgets of the State Ministry of the Interior (2004–2013), the State Ministry of the Environment (2004–2010), the State Ministry of Agriculture (2004–2010) and the Office for the Protection of the Constitution (2004–2013).

Political career
Ahead of the 2013 state elections, Stephan Weil included Honé in his shadow cabinet for the Social Democrats’ campaign to unseat incumbent Minister President David McAllister.

As one of the state's representatives at the Bundesrat since 2017, Honé is a member of the Committee on Foreign Affairs and the Committee on European Affairs. She is also a member of the German-French Friendship Group set up by the German Bundesrat and the French Senate.

Honé is also a member of the European Committee of the Regions (CoR).

Honé was nominated by her party as delegate to the Federal Convention for the purpose of electing the President of Germany in 2022.

Other activities
 Business Forum of the Social Democratic Party of Germany, Member of the Political Advisory Board
 Foundation "Remembrance, Responsibility and Future“ (EVZ), Deputy Member of the Board of Trustees

References

1960 births
Living people